Tarczyn may refer to the following:
Tarczyn, a town in Masovian Voivodeship (east-central Poland)
Tarczyn, Lower Silesian Voivodeship, a village in Lwówek Śląski County, Lower Silesian Voivodeship (SW Poland)
Tarczyn, a brand of Agros Nova products